Al Jabbar FC Cirebon is an Indonesian football club based in Pabuaran, Cirebon, West Java. They currently compete in the Liga 3.

Honours
 Liga 3 West Java Series 2
 Champions: 2022

References

Cirebon Regency
Football clubs in Indonesia
Football clubs in West Java
Association football clubs established in 2017
2017 establishments in Indonesia